Video Hits Volume I is a collection of various Van Halen video hits. The DVD version - released in November 1999 - has the same videos as the VHS but also includes the video for "Without You" (Van Halen III). Some songs ("Don't Tell Me (What Love Can Do)", "Humans Being" and "Without You") are the edited/single versions and not the unedited/album versions. Quite a few of the group's earliest videos are absent as well, such as "Runnin' with the Devil" and "You Really Got Me".

Track listing
"Jump"
"Panama"
"Hot for Teacher"
"When It's Love"
"Finish What Ya Started"
"Poundcake"
"Runaround"
"Right Now"
"Dreams"
"Don't Tell Me (What Love Can Do)"
"Can't Stop Lovin' You"
"Not Enough"
"Humans Being"
"Without You"

Excluded music videos
"Runnin' with the Devil"
"You Really Got Me"
"Jamie's Cryin'"
"Dance the Night Away"
"Loss of Control"
"Hear About It Later"
"Unchained"
"So This Is Love?"
"(Oh) Pretty Woman"
"Dreams" (Blue Angels version)
"Feels So Good"
"Top of the World"
"Amsterdam"
"Fire in the Hole"

Certifications

|-

References

1996 video albums
Van Halen video albums
Music video compilation albums
1996 compilation albums
Van Halen compilation albums